Cyrus Hashemi (also spelled Hashimi; 27 December 1938 – 21 July 1986) was an Iranian arms dealer linked to the Iran-Contra affair, Brokers of Death arms case, and October Surprise conspiracy theory. Robert Dreyfuss claimed Hashemi was a CIA and Mossad agent; Hashemi sued Dreyfuss and Lyndon LaRouche, whose Executive Intelligence Review had accused Hashemi of being linked to the  alleged "funding of Iranian terrorism in the United States," with the case dismissed in June 1983 due to Hashemi's failure to respond to legal documents. Hashemi died from acute myeloblastic leukemia July 1986 in London.

Background
Hashemi and his brother Jamshid Hashemi were persecuted by the Shah's SAVAK during the 1963 White Revolution, and left Iran as a result. The Hashemis had connections with Ahmed Madani, who was exiled in 1970 and went on to become Defense Minister after the 1979 Revolution.

The Hashemis supported the 1979 Iranian Revolution, and Jamshid was appointed to oversee the national radio network, where he worked with Mehdi Karroubi's brother Hassan. Hashemi said he was a cousin to Akbar Hashemi Rafsanjani, an aide of the Ayatollah Khomeini who was elected Speaker of the Iranian Parliament in 1980.

Iran hostage crisis
From November 1980 to January 1981 wiretaps were placed in the New York offices of the First Gulf Bank and Trust Company, of which Hashemi was the head. The bank had handled clandestine money transfers for the Iranian government, with Admiral Ahmad Madani, then the Defense Minister, ordering $30–$35m transferred to an account there in late 1979.

A 1992 Senate investigation concluded that Hashemi was involved in a 1980 CIA attempt to funnel $500,000 to the campaign of Iranian presidential candidate Ahmad Madani, ahead of the 1980 Iranian presidential election. Charles Cogan met with Hashemi and his brother Jamshid in New York on 5 January, and in the context of the Iran hostage crisis the Hashemis "promised to put U.S. officials in touch with top officials in the Tehran government, including a family member of the Ayatollah Ruhollah Khomeini", but asked for financial support for Madani. The CIA provided $500,000 in cash on 17 January, which was rejected in favour of a wire transfer via Switzerland. Hashemi later returned $290,000 to Cogan, via the office of John Stanley Pottinger, after Cogan had determined that less than $100,000 had been spent for its intended purpose. Madani later testified to the House October Surprise Task Force that he had told off Hashemi for attempting to collaborate with the Republicans behind Carter's back; he said Hashemi had offered to bring Casey to a meeting to discuss a hostage deal.

Mid-1980s
According to the Los Angeles Times, by the mid-1980s Hashemi, although maintaining an appearance of wealth (such as commuting to his London office in a gold-trimmed Rolls-Royce) was facing bankruptcy, in part due to major gambling losses sustained in London casinos.

In mid-1985 Hashemi was partnered with Adnan Khashoggi in "World Trade Group", "a joint venture ... that was seeking to trade farm equipment, oil and military weapons with Iran." Roy Furmark was also involved.

In June 1985 Hashemi approached William Casey with a new arms-for-hostages plan. The Los Angeles Times reported in 1988 that "according to newly declassified CIA and State Department memos, Hashemi approached then-CIA Director William J. Casey with an arms-for-hostages plan of his own that was strikingly similar to the one that would soon be embraced by the White House as its secret Iran arms initiative." A June 1985 CIA memo documented a call regarding a potential arms-for-hostages deal from Hashemi to Shaheen. The Times said in 1988 it had discovered that Hashemi was meeting with Adnan Khashoggi and Manucher Ghorbanifar, and that Hashemi's efforts to arrange a deal collapsed in August 1985 due to Kashoggi's competing efforts to arrange US access to Ghorbanifar via Robert McFarlane.

Brokers of Death arms case

In 1986 Hashemi acted as a government informant in a four-month sting operation for the US Customs Service, resulting in the Brokers of Death arms case, which the Los Angeles Times described in 1988 as "the largest arms conspiracy prosecution ever brought by the Justice Department". Hashemi had agreed to act as an informant in exchange for the dropping of arms smuggling charges against him.

Cyrus Hashemi died suddenly on 21 July 1986 after becoming ill with a rare and "virulent" form of leukemia diagnosed only two days earlier.

References

1938 births
1986 deaths
Arms traders
20th-century Iranian businesspeople
Deaths from leukemia
Iran–Contra affair
Iran hostage crisis